Berberis silvicola is a species of plant in the family Berberidaceae. It is endemic to China.

References

silvicola
Endemic flora of China
Vulnerable plants
Taxonomy articles created by Polbot